Torab (also Romanized as Torāb) is a village in Howmeh-ye Jonubi Rural District, in the Central District of Eslamabad-e Gharb County, Kermanshah Province, Iran. At the 2006 census, its population was 322, in 69 families.

References 

Populated places in Eslamabad-e Gharb County